The muskie is a species of freshwater fish native to North America.

Muskie may also refer to:

 Muskie Act, nickname for the U.S. Clean Air Act of 1963
 Muskie Muskrat, a character in American Deputy Dawg cartoons
 Big Muskie, an enormous coal-mining dragline excavator used in Ohio, U.S.
 Edmund Muskie (1914–1996), American politician
 Jane Muskie (1927–2004), First Lady of Maine
 Muskingum Fighting Muskies, team name for Muskingum University in New Concord, Ohio
 Muskie, a 1996 IBM microprocessor used in AS/400 machines
 Muskie, a processor in the IBM RS64 line of CPUs
 Muskie 101, branding for radio station WHSM-FM in Hayward, Wisconsin, U.S.
 Muskies, team name for Muscatine High School in Muscatine, Iowa, U.S.

See also

 
 
 Carol Muske-Dukes (born 1945) U.S. writer
 Musk (disambiguation)